The 1994 UEFA Cup Final was a two-legged match that took place on 26 April 1994 and 11 May 1994 at the Ernst-Happel-Stadion in Vienna and San Siro in Milan between Inter Milan of Italy and Austria Salzburg of Austria. Inter won both games 1–0 to record a 2–0 aggregate victory.

Route to the final

Match

First leg

Second leg

See also
1993–94 UEFA Cup
Inter Milan in European football

External links
1993–94 season at UEFA.com

Final
Inter Milan matches
FC Red Bull Salzburg matches
1994
International club association football competitions hosted by Italy
International club association football competitions hosted by Austria
April 1994 sports events in Europe
May 1994 sports events in Europe
1994 UEFA Cup Fina
1994 UEFA Cup Fina
Sports competitions in Vienna
Sports competitions in Milan